is a 1969 Japanese horror film directed by Teruo Ishii, who also co-wrote the film.

Plot

Hirosuke (Teruo Yoshida), a medical student with almost no recollection of his past, is trapped in an asylum, despite being perfectly sane. After escaping, and being framed for the murder of a circus girl, he spots the photo of a recently deceased man, Genzaburo Komoda, to whom he bears an uncanny resemblance. By pretending to have been resurrected, Hirosuke assumes the dead man's identity, fooling everyone, including Komoda's widow and mistress. Whilst at the Komoda household, Hirosuke recalls memories that convince him to travel to a nearby island, home of Jogoro, the web-fingered father of Genzaburo. Whilst on the island, Hirosuke not only discovers Jogoro's plans to build his 'ideal community' (by transforming perfectly normal humans into hideous freaks), but also the awful truth behind his own identity.

Cast
 Teruo Yoshida as Hirosuke Hitomi/Genzaburô Komoda
Tatsumi Hijikata as Jogoro
 Yukie Kagawa as Shizuko
 Teruko Yumi as Hideko/Hatsuyo
 Mitsuko Aoi as Toki Komoda
 Asao Koike
 Michiko Kobata as Chiyoko Komoda
 Minoru Ōki as Kogorô Akechi/Manservant

Release

Home media
On August 28, 2007, Synapse Films and Panik House gave Horrors of Malformed Men a mass-market release on region-1 DVD.

Reception

Later reception

Donald Guarisco from Allmovie praised the film, calling it "a powerful, transgressive work that still packs a punch". Stuart Galbraith IV from DVD Talk wrote, "With its odd mix of absurdist theater, surreal images, taboo-breaking depravity, and commercially driven exploitation, it's all over the stylistic map and not for all tastes, but a fascinating film on many levels". Ian Jane from RockShockPop.com called it "A genuine holy grail of Japanese genre cinema", commending the film's choreography, cinematography, mood, and use of surreal imagery. Arty Flores from HorrorNews.net liked the film,  commending its bizarre and surreal imagery, while also noting that the film felt dated.

Legacy

The film is considered a precursor to Toei's ventures into the "Pinky violent" style in the early 1970s.

References

Notes

External links 
 
 
 

1969 films
1969 horror films
Films about cannibalism
Films based on works by Edogawa Ranpo
Films directed by Teruo Ishii
Films shot in Japan
Incest in film
Japanese horror films
1960s Japanese-language films
Films based on Japanese novels
Films based on multiple works
Toei Company films
1960s Japanese films